The 2006 USA Outdoor Track and Field Championships was organised by USA Track & Field and held from June 22 to 25 at the IU Michael A. Carroll Track & Soccer Stadium in Indianapolis, Indiana. The four-day competition served as the national championships in track and field for the United States. As there was no Summer Olympics or World Championships in Athletics held that year, the competition did not serve as a national team selection event.

It was the fourth time that the stadium in Indianapolis had held the combined gender national track and field event, having last done so for the 1997 edition. The USA Junior Championships were held in conjunction with the event, starting one day earlier, and were used for selection for the 2006 World Junior Championships in Athletics.

Bad weather including heavy storms caused a rearrangement of the programme, with many events scheduled on the first day being postponed. The weather also affected the calibre of performances at the meeting.

Then world record holder Justin Gatlin was among the major names to feature at the competition, but his 100 m win in 9.93 seconds was later removed from the record books due to his failing a doping test in April earlier that year.

Bernard Lagat, newly eligible to compete after gaining citizenship in 2005, completed a 1500 m/5000 m double. This was the first time that a man had ever achieved that feat at the American national championships, with Alexander Grant's 1903 double in the mile run and two miles being the closest equivalent.

Breaux Greer had a seventh straight win in the men's javelin throw, making him the most successful javelin athlete in the history of the championships. Daniel Lincoln extended his national streak in the steeplechase to three wins, while A.G. Kruger broke James Parker's hammer throw streak of the same length. Jennifer Stuczynski brought an end to Stacy Dragila's dominance of the women's pole vault – in which Dragila had won seventh straight national titles. Kim Kreiner had a third successive victory in the women's javelin, setting a new American record in the process.

Results

Men track events

Men field events

 The original winner, Justin Gatlin in 9.93 seconds, was later disqualified due to doping.

Women track events

Women field events

References

Results
Full Results - Open. USATF. Retrieved on 2015-06-28.
Day reports
Dunaway, James (2006-06-23). Storms cause postponements - USATF Nationals, Day Two. IAAF. Retrieved on 2015-06-28.
Dunaway, James (2006-06-24). Gatlin 9.93, Nelson powers to Shot Put title - USATF Nationals Day Three. IAAF. Retrieved on 2015-06-28.
Dunaway, James (2006-06-25). Richards explodes to 49.27 – USATF Nationals, Day Four. IAAF. Retrieved on 2015-06-28.
Dunaway, James (2006-06-26). Spearmon's 200m in 19.90 highlights 6 world leads - USATF Nationals, Final Day. IAAF. Retrieved on 2015-06-28.

USA Outdoor Track and Field Championships
USA Outdoors
Track, Outdoor
Sports competitions in Indianapolis
USA Outdoor Track and Field Championships
Track and field in Indiana